Betrayal ( Trahir) is a 1993 Romanian film directed by Radu Mihăileanu. It won Grand Prix des Amériques, the main prize as well as three additional prizes at the Montreal World Film Festival.

References

External links
 

1993 films
Romanian historical drama films
1990s Romanian-language films